The University of Michigan Herbarium is the herbarium of the University of Michigan in Ann Arbor, Michigan, in the United States. One of the most-extensive botanical collections in the world, the herbarium has some 1.7 million specimens of vascular plants, algae, bryophytes, fungi, and lichens, and is a valuable resource for teaching and research in biology and botany. The herbarium includes many rare and extinct species.

Administration
Formerly an independent unit of the University of Michigan College of Literature, Science, and the Arts (LSA), the herbarium is now part of the Department of Ecology and Evolutionary Biology within LSA. The herbarium is located at 3600 Varsity Drive in Ann Arbor.

The Herbarium funds one Graduate Museum Assistant annually. It also has since 1977 awarded the annual Kenneth L. Jones Award to an outstanding plant sciences undergraduate at the University of Michigan.

History
The Herbarium's collection was established in 1837. Dr. Asa Gray was appointed Professor of Botany and Zoology in 1838. Collections were moved to the Main Building (later Mason Hall) in 1841. The first published research paper based on the university's botanical holdings came in 1877, when a paper by Professor Mark W. Harrington was published in the Botanical Journal of the Linnean Society.

Mycologist Alexander H. Smith spent his entire career at the University of Michigan Herbarium, and was its longtime director.

In 1982, the museum marked its 60th anniversary; by that time, the herbarium had "grown from a modest collection of plants to become one of the largest university herbariums in the nations."

Collections
Among the 1.7 million specimens held by the Herbarium are:
96,000 specimens of algae - "includes much material from classical exsiccate sets, including the Phycotheca Boreali-Americana of about 45 folios and W. H. Harvey's specimens from Australia, Ceylon, and the Friendly Islands," as well as "the former personal herbaria of W. R. Taylor and M. J. Wynne, the basis for much of their work on the systematics and floristics of seaweeds."
163,000 specimens of bryophytes - including many from W. C. Steere, R. Schuster, and H. Crum. "The best representation is from eastern North America, especially the Great Lakes area, but the collection has significant material from Europe, Japan, Central America, northern South America, and the West Indies. The holdings in Mexican mosses are especially rich." I. Schnooberger gave a singifcant give of 8,000 specimens of bryophytes of the Great lakes region in 1985.
280,000 specimens of fungi - A collection "extraordinarily strong in North American higher fungi, with, among others, the collections of A. H. Smith (agarics, boletes, and gastromycetes), C. H. Kauffman (agarics), D. Baxter (polypores), R. L. Shaffer (agarics), and R. Fogel (hypogeous fungi). Material on which the taxonomic studies of E. B. Mains, on the Uredinales, insecticolous fungi, and Geoglossaceae, and of B. Kanouse, on discomycetes are largely based is in the collection, as are many of L. E. Wehmeyer's pyrenomycetous fungi. The personal herbarium of F. K. Sparrow, which contains mostly specimens of the parasitic genera Physoderma and Urophlyctis as well as a microscope-slide collection of aquatic fungi, is also included." Phyllis Kempton, the well-known mycologist who studied Alaska mushrooms with her research partner Virginia Wells for nearly 45 years, bequeathed her huge collection to the Herbarium after her death in 2001.
57,000 specimens of lichens - "The prime importance of the lichen collection derives from the fact that it includes the herbarium of Bruce Fink, upon which his Lichen Flora of the United States is largely based. Many of Fink's specimens were compared with type material in European herbaria by the leading lichenologist of the time, Alexander Zahlbruckner. The lichen herbarium has a good representation from most parts of the United States and southern Canada and also from Puerto Rico and British Honduras. Michigan is well covered by the collections of J. Lowe, H. Imshaug, C. Wetmore, and R. Harris, and the Rocky Mountains by those of E. B. Mains, A. H. Smith, and H. Imshaug. Exchange has resulted in an abundance of European specimens, making the herbarium a good research and reference resource. About 10,000 specimens in the lichen collection have been studies by thin-layer chromatography, with the data obtained recorded on their packets."
1.1 million specimens of vascular plants - The herbarium's largest collection. "In pteridophytes, the (Edwin Copeland) herbarium gives the collection great strength from eastern Asia and the southwestern Pacific region; indeed, we probably have the western hemisphere's best collection of ferns from southeastern Asia. Hawaii is exceptionally well represented, and coverage of continental United States is excellent, partly due to the acquisition of the American Fern Society herbarium; the North American collections of W. H. Wagner are another strength of the collection."

Notes

External links
Official website

Herbaria in the United States
Herbarium
1837 establishments in Michigan
University of Michigan campus